My Friend from the Park is a 2015 Argentine drama film directed by Ana Katz. It was shown in the World Cinema Dramatic Competition section at the 2016 Sundance Film Festival where it won the award for screenwriting.

Cast
 Julieta Zylberberg as Liz
 Andrés Milicich as Nicanor
 Mirella Pascual as Yazmina
 Tomás Newkirk as Pediatra
 Ana Katz as Rosa
 Manuela García Dudiuk as Clarisa
 Maricel Álvarez as Renata

References

External links
 

2015 films
2015 drama films
Argentine drama films
2010s Spanish-language films
Films set in Buenos Aires
Films shot in Buenos Aires
Films shot in Uruguay
Films directed by Ana Katz
2010s Argentine films